Juan de Armas (born 31 August 1922) was a Uruguayan cyclist. He competed at the 1948 and 1952 Summer Olympics.

References

External links
 

1922 births
Possibly living people
Uruguayan male cyclists
Olympic cyclists of Uruguay
Cyclists at the 1948 Summer Olympics
Cyclists at the 1952 Summer Olympics